Northern Bantoid (or North Bantoid) is a branch of the Bantoid languages. It consists of the Mambiloid, Dakoid, and Tikar languages of eastern Nigeria and west-central Cameroon.

History
A proposal that divided Bantoid into North and South Bantoid was introduced by Williamson.

Blench argues for the unity of North Bantoid by citing phonological, lexical, and morphological evidence.

Internal classification
Blench classifies these languages as North Bantoid.

Tikar (divergent)
Mambiloid (possibly including the divergent Ndoro–Fam languages)
Dakoid

Language contact
Dakoid languages have had long-term contact with Adamawa languages, while the Tikar language shares many similarities with the Bafia languages (also known as the A50 Bantu languages).

Maps

Numerals
Comparison of numerals in individual languages:

References

Blench, Roger. The North Bantoid hypothesis.
Blench, Roger. 2011. 'The membership and internal structure of Bantoid and the border with Bantu'. Bantu IV, Humboldt University, Berlin.